Joseph Harold Sheldon  (1893–1972) was a British physician, surgeon, and gerontologist.

Education and career
After education at Bancroft's, a Drapers’ Company School at Woodford, J. Harold Sheldon went to work at the secretarial department of Lloyds Bank. As he approached the age of twenty, he became fervently religious and decided to leave Lloyds Bank and become a Christian medical missionary. With a Worsley scholarship, he began the study of medicine at King's College Hospital Medical School in 1913.

After qualifying MRCS, LRCP and graduating MB BS (Lond.) in 1918, he volunteered, after the end of WWI, as a Surgeon Lieutenant for mine-sweeping in the Baltic. He abandoned his ambition to become a medical missionary. He held appointments at King's College Hospital and from 1919 to 1920 was Sambroke Surgical Registrar and Tutor there. In 1920 he graduated MD and qualified MRCP. In 1921 he was appointed to the staff of the Royal Hospital, Wolverhampton. In 1929 he was elected FRCP.

He gained an outstanding medical reputation throughout the Midlands and into mid-Wales. In Wolverhampton, he arranged his out-patient clinic to coincide with market day, for the convenience of his patients. He was consultant physician to several hospitals.

Sheldon's 1961 Report to the Birmingham Regional Hospital Board on its Geriatric Service found inadequate hospital services for infirm geriatric patients. He made several recommendations including replacement of some older hospital buildings, appointment of more geriatric physicians, more postgraduate medical education in modern geriatrics, and adequate staffing of all sections of rehabilitation teams for geriatric patients.

In 1949 under the auspices of the Royal College of Physicians, he gave the F. E. Williams Lecture on the role of the aged in modern society. In 1954 he was elected president of the International Association of Gerontology, and in 1955 he went on an international lecture tour devoted to gerontology. In 1955 he was appointed CBE. In 1956 he was made a Fellow of King's College London.

Hobbies

Family
J. Harold Sheldon had two brothers and two sisters. His brother Wilfrid became Sir Wilfrid Sheldon KCVO, FRCP, and his brother Geoffrey Colin Sheldon (1906–1997) became a general practitioner in Reigate. In 1921 in Newport, Monmouthshire, J. Harold Sheldon married Marjorie Bannister. Their first child, Peggy, was born in 1924. Their second child died at birth. In 1927 they took a trip to the Alps, and Marjorie died, probably from a large pulmonary embolus, while they were mountaineering. In 1961 on the Isle of Wight, he married Miss Luckett, with whom he had worked for many years. The couple moved to a small cottage in Codsall Wood.

Selected publications

with Hugh Ramage: 
with Wilfrid Sheldon: 

with Hugh Ramage: 

 

with Wilfrid Sheldon: 
with Herbert Dingle: 
wit E. A. Freeman:

References

1893 births
1972 deaths
People educated at Bancroft's School
20th-century English medical doctors
British gerontologists
Commanders of the Order of the British Empire
Fellows of the Royal College of Physicians
Fellows of King's College London
Royal Navy Medical Service officers